Senator Cash may refer to:

Wilbur J. Cash (politician) (1887–1956), Illinois State Senate
William Thomas Cash (1878–1951), Florida State Senate